Daniel Steedman (born 31 January 2000) is a Scottish born American footballer.

Career

Youth and college 
On 3 September 2018, Steedman made his college soccer debut for Virginia playing 82 minutes in 0–0 draw against Maryland in a rivalry match at Audi Field. On 12 October, he scored his first collegiate goal in a 4–1 win over Clemson. A week later, he scored his second goal of the season against Wake Forest. He finished his freshman year and the 2018 Atlantic Coast Conference men's soccer season being named to the All-ACC Freshman Team.

Senior 
On 13 February 2018, Steedman signed an amateur contract with the Charlotte Independence which would allow him to retain his NCAA eligibility, while playing in a professional environment.

On 12 May Steedman made his USL debut, coming on in a 4–1 win against FC Cincinnati.

Steedman played two years of college soccer at the University of Virginia in 2018 and 2019, before signing a professional contract with USL Championship side Atlanta United 2 on 8 January 2020.

On 21 January 2021, Steedman was selected 28th overall in the 2021 MLS SuperDraft by Austin FC. However, he wasn't signed by the club.

In July 2021, Steedman trialed with Scottish Championship side Partick Thistle.

On 27 August, Steedman signed with USL League One side North Carolina FC for the remainder of the season.

References

External links 
 

2000 births
Living people
Scottish footballers
Scottish expatriate footballers
Atlanta United 2 players
Austin FC draft picks
Charlotte Independence players
Virginia Cavaliers men's soccer players
Association football midfielders
People from Cornelius, North Carolina
Soccer players from Charlotte, North Carolina
USL Championship players
North Carolina FC players
USL League One players